Govareshk (also Romanized as Govāreshk, Gavāreshg, Gavāreshk, and Gavārishk) is a village in Darzab Rural District in the Central District of Mashhad County, Razavi Khorasan Province, Iran. At the 2006 census, its population was 910, with 265 families.

References 

Populated places in Mashhad County